The 1931 Delaware State Hornets football team represented Delaware State University as an independent during the 1931 college football season. The team was coached by John L. McKinley, who came to Delaware State from New York City. Delaware State compiled a record of 2–2–1 on the season.

Schedule

References

Delaware State
Delaware State Hornets football seasons
Delaware State Hornets football